The Conquerors, historical television series looks at famous leaders, such as Cortés, Andrew Jackson and others, and shows how they rose to prominence and vanquished enemies in the field.

Broadcast and release

Episodes 

 Episode 1 - William the Conqueror
 Episode 2 - General William Howe, Conqueror of New York
 Episode 3 - Andrew Jackson, Conqueror of Florida
 Episode 4 - Cortés, Conqueror of Mexico
 Episode 5 - John C. Fremont, Conqueror of California
 Episode 6 - El Cid
 Episode 7 - Marshal Zhukov, World War II Conqueror of Berlin
 Episode 8 - Sherman's March to the Sea	
 Episode 9 - Cromwell, Conqueror of Ireland
 Episode 10 - King David
 Episode 11 - Napoleon's Greatest Victory
 Episode 12 - Caesar, Conqueror of Gaul

Cast and Crew

Series Writing Credits 
Alexander Emmert  ...	(4 episodes, 2005)
Doug Cohen	  ...	(1 episode, 2005)
Martin Kent	  ...	(1 episode, 2005)
Scott Billups	  ...	(unknown episodes)
Sonya Gay Bourn	  ...	(unknown episodes)
Andrew Nock	  ...	(unknown episodes)

Series Cast 
Dale Dye	...	Himself - Host (12 episodes)
Roger McGrath	... Himself (2 episodes)
Dana Lombardi	...	Himself (1 episode)
Conquerors	...	Lady #1 (1 episode)
Joe di Gennaro	...	Archery Battalion (1 episode)
Richard Handley	...	Philistine (1 episode)
Richard Jones	...	Himself - Historian (1 episode)
Aren Maefr	...	Himself (1 episode)
J. Sears McFee	...	Himself (1 episode)
Davy Perez	...	King Reynaldo (1 episode)
Douglas Sunlin	...	Anglo-Saxon warrior (1 episode)
Joseph Tatner	...	General William Howe (1 episode)
Koren Young	...	King David's Soldier (1 episode)

References 
http://www.imdb.com/title/tt0454702/fullcredits?ref_=tt_cl_sm#cast

2005 American television series debuts
History (American TV channel) original programming